Yellow King can refer to:

 The King in Yellow, an anthology of short stories by Robert W. Chambers
 The Yellow King, a figure referenced in True Detective (season 1)
 Yellow Emperor, a legendary emperor of China